Anetia pantheratus is a species of butterfly in the Danainae subfamily. It is found in Cuba, the Dominican Republic, and Haiti. It is commonly known as the "false fritillary" of the Caribbean.

Notes

Anetia
Butterflies described in 1797
Taxonomy articles created by Polbot